John W. Mauer (September 4, 1901 – December 20, 1978) was an American college basketball, baseball and football coach and multi-sport college athlete. During the course of his 36-year collegiate coaching career, Mauer was the head basketball coach at the University of Kentucky, Miami University (Ohio), the University of Tennessee, the U.S. Military Academy, and the University of Florida. John was the head coach of the Tennessee baseball team. John also served as  the defensive backs coach for Tennessee under head coach General Robert Neyland. After coaching his college coaching career, John worked under Vince Lombardi scouting players for the Green Bay Packers. Mauer also scouted for the San Francisco 49ers, Atlanta Falcons, and New York Giants.

Early life and education 

Mauer was born in 1901 at Aurora, Illinois. Both of his parents died by the time he was 13 years old, and he was raised by his older sister. With the financial assistance of a local businessman, he attended Batavia High School in Batavia, Illinois and was able to enroll in college.

Mauer attended the University of Illinois in Urbana, Illinois from 1922 to 1926, where he played for the Illinois Fighting Illini men's basketball team. As a player, he was remembered for being one of the pioneers of one-handed shooting.  While attending Illinois, his roommate was Illini football great Harold E. "Red" Grange. Mauer was named Outstanding Athlete and Scholar in the Big Ten Conference as a senior, and graduated from Illinois with a bachelor's degree in 1926.

Coaching career 

Mauer was the head coach in football, basketball, and track at Batavia High School, from 1926 to 1927, after which he was the head coach of the Kentucky Wildcats men's basketball team of the University of Kentucky in Lexington, Kentucky from 1927 to 1930, immediately preceding the legendary Adolph Rupp.  Mauer's successful Wildcats teams were known as the "Mauer men," and he was one of the first coaches to popularize the bounce pass as an element of basketball offense.  His Wildcats teams posted an overall win–loss record of 40–14 (.741) in three seasons.

After leaving Kentucky, he became the head coach of the Miami Redskins men's basketball team of Miami University in Oxford, Ohio, coaching the Redskins (now known as the "RedHawks") for eight seasons from 1930 to 1938. Mauer did not have a winning record in his first five seasons with the Redskins, but posted winning records in two of his final three seasons. During the 1937–1938 season, the Redskins finished 11–5. At Miami, he coached Walter "Smoky" Alston who would go on manage the Brooklyn and Los Angeles Dodgers. He finished his Miami career with an overall record of 46–80 (.365), leaving Oxford after the 1937–1938 season, and was replaced by Weeb Ewbank.

Mauer became the head coach for the Tennessee Volunteers men's basketball team of the University of Tennessee in Knoxville, Tennessee, for eight seasons between 1938 and 1947.  Mauer's Volunteers had significant success, posting an overall record of 127–41 (.756), and winning two Southeastern Conference (SEC) championships (1941, 1943) and two SEC tournaments (1941, 1943). In 1945, John led the team to the Quarterfinals in the National Invitation Tournament (NIT). At the time, the National Invitation Tournament was more prestigious than the NCAA basketball tournament. During his time as the Volunteers' head basketball coach, he also worked as the head coach of the Tennessee Volunteers baseball team from 1938 to 1942, and as an assistant football coach for the Tennessee Volunteers football team under head coaches Neyland and John Barnhill from 1938 to 1946.

Mauer later served as the head coach for the Army Black Knights men's basketball team of the U.S. Military Academy in West Point, New York, for four seasons from 1947 to 1951, and the Florida Gators men's basketball team of the University of Florida in Gainesville, Florida, for nine seasons from 1951 to 1960.  His four Army Cadets teams finished 33–35 (.485); his nine Gators teams compiled a record of 98–102 (.490).  While coaching the Gators basketball team, he also served as an assistant coach for the Florida Gators football team under head coaches Bob Woodruff and Ray Graves.

After his final season as the Gators' basketball mentor, Mauer returned to the University of Tennessee and worked as an assistant coach for the Volunteers football team from 1960 to 1963 under head coaches Bowden Wyatt and Jim McDonald.

Legacy 

Mauer died in Knoxville on December 20, 1978; he was 77 years old.  He was survived by his wife Grace, their two sons, and their five grandchildren.

Mauer was the first, and to date the only, person to serve as the head coach in the same sport at three different SEC universities.  His winning percentage as the Tennessee Volunteers men's basketball head coach remains the best of the modern era; his winning percentage as the Kentucky Wildcats' head is still among the program's six best of the modern era. Mauer was posthumously inducted into the Tennessee Sports Hall of Fame in 2002.

Head coaching record

College basketball

See also 

 Army Black Knights
 Florida Gators
 History of the University of Florida
 Illinois Fighting Illini
 Kentucky Wildcats
 List of University of Illinois people
 Miami Redhawks
 Tennessee Volunteers
 University Athletic Association

References

External links

1901 births
1978 deaths
American men's basketball players
Army Black Knights men's basketball coaches
Atlanta Falcons scouts
Basketball coaches from Illinois
Basketball players from Illinois
Florida Gators football coaches
Florida Gators men's basketball coaches
Green Bay Packers scouts
Illinois Fighting Illini men's basketball players
Kentucky Wildcats men's basketball coaches
Miami RedHawks men's basketball coaches
New York Giants scouts
San Francisco 49ers scouts
Sportspeople from Aurora, Illinois
Tennessee Volunteers baseball coaches
Tennessee Volunteers basketball coaches
Tennessee Volunteers football coaches